Del Roy was a racing car constructor. Del Roy cars competed in one round of the FIA World Championship - the 1953 Indianapolis 500.

World Championship Indy 500 results

References

Formula One constructors (Indianapolis only)
American racecar constructors